

The End of the Free Market: Who Wins the War Between States and Corporations? is a 2010 non-fiction book by Ian Bremmer, that discusses the rise of state capitalism, a system in which governments dominate local economies through ownership of market-dominant companies and large pools of excess capital, using them for political gain. This trend, Bremmer argues, challenges America's economic strength and the conduct of free markets everywhere.

Reviews 

American Antitrust Institute 
Asia Times 
Bloomberg.com 
Business World
The Daily Telegraph 
The Economist 
European Affairs 
Foreign Affairs 
The Indian Express 
The National 
The New Statesman 
The New York Times 
Publishers Weekly 
RealClearPolitics 
Reuters 
The Wall Street Journal 
The Washington Post 
The Washington Times

Awards 

Financial Times: Summer's Best Books; Year's Best Books
Financial Times and Goldman Sachs Business Book of the Year Award, Long-List: 
Foreign Affairs: Must Read Book of 2010, Fareed Zakaria
The Hindu: Print Pick
The Week: Dambisa Moyo's 6 Favorite Books

References 
The Daily Telegraph: The West Should Fear the Growth of State Capitalism
Financial Times: State Capitalism: China's Market Leninism Has Yet to Face Biggest Test
Foreign Affairs: State Capitalism Comes of Age, by Ian Bremmer
Le Monde: Is There An Alternative to the Free Market
The New York Times: David Brooks on the End of The Free Market
Spears: Free the Markets!
The Wall Street Journal: Iain Martin on The End of the Free Market
Book website

2010 non-fiction books